MTV Party To Go 2000 was the fourteenth album in the MTV Party to Go series.

Track listing
Everybody (Backstreet's Back) – Backstreet Boys
Here We Go – 'N Sync
Crush (Strobe's Deeply Crushed Mix) – Jennifer Paige
How Do I Live (Mr. Mig Dance Edit) – LeAnn Rimes
Sexual (Li Da Di) (Thunderpuss 2000 Remix) – Amber
Stay the Same (Tony Moran Radio Remix) – Joey McIntyre
5, 6, 7, 8 (Extended Version) – Steps
Are You That Somebody? – Aaliyah
The First Night – Monica
Come Correct – Before Dark
Where My Girls At? – 702
Thinkin' About You – Britney Spears
How Do I Deal – Jennifer Love Hewitt
The Hardest Thing – 98 Degrees

Mtv Party To Go 14
1999 compilation albums
Tommy Boy Records compilation albums
Dance-pop compilation albums
Pop compilation albums